Jason Flom (born c. 1961) is an American music industry executive, podcaster and philanthropist. He is the founder of Lava Records, and was previously the chairman of Atlantic Records and Virgin Records/Capitol Music Group. He is also an advocate for those who have allegedly been wrongfully convicted.

Career
In 1979, while a college freshman at New York University, Flom got a job as a trainee field merchandiser at Atlantic Records hanging record posters in stores. In 1981, he moved to the sales research team and, in 1983, into Atlantic's A & R department.

At 20, Flom departed NYU to work full-time at Atlantic. Bands he signed at the time included Skid Row.

In mid April 1994 Jason listened to Hootie & The Blowfish’s debut album and said it was “unreleasable” and tried to pass on one of the all time best selling albums.

In 1995, Flom launched Lava Records in partnership with Atlantic Records.

In 2004, Flom sold Lava Records to Atlantic Records Group, where he was named Chairman and CEO of the Atlantic Records Group.

Flom was named Chairman and CEO of Virgin Records in 2005. In 2007, he led a merger with Capitol Records to create the Capitol Music Group, where he was named Chairman and CEO. In 2007 he signed Katy Perry.

In 2008, Flom left Capitol Music Group to re-launch his own Lava Records label, this time in partnership with Universal Music Group's Republic Records. In 2013, Flom signed Lorde to Lava, which released her debut single, "Royals".

Flom founded Lava Publishing in 2014, which has published writing from Evan Konrad, Maty Noyes, and all four members of Greta Van Fleet.

In 2018, Flom co-wrote a children's book called "Lulu is a Rhinoceros" with his daughter, Allison Flom - a book which follows a bulldog named Lulu who identifies as a rhino.

Philanthropy 
In 1993, he joined the board of Families Against Mandatory Minimums and soon after became a founding Board Member of the Innocence Project. As part of his work with the Innocence Project, Flom launched the podcast Wrongful Conviction with Jason Flom in 2016. The podcast features interviews with men and women who have spent time in prison for crimes they claim they did not commit and other activists, advocates and experts. Notable guests on the podcast include Kim Kardashian, John Grisham, Meek Mill, Amanda Knox, Raymond Santana, Brendan Dassey, and Rodney Reed, among others. The podcast reached to #7 on the iTunes charts within its first 2 weeks of release, and has since been downloaded over 10 million times. 

In 2018, Flom and Jeff Kempler founded Lava for Good. Its podcast series are hosted by human rights and justice experts, activists, attorneys, journalists, as well as formerly incarcerated persons. The Lava for Good lineup includes Wrongful Conviction, Wrongful Conviction with Maggie Freleng, Righteous Convictions with Jason Flom, Bone Valley, False Confessions, as well as Junk Science. 

2021 saw Lava for Good honored with a Webby Award win in the Crime & Justice category for Wrongful Conviction: False Confessions. In 2022, Lava for Good won a Silver Anthem Award for Human & Civil Rights - Best Strategy. Wrongful Conviction and Wrongful Conviction with Maggie Freleng were honored with Silver and Bronze/Listener's Choice Awards, respectively, at the first inaugural Signal Awards announced in January 2023. 

Flom also sits on the board of directors of the Legal Action Center, which uses legal and policy strategies to fight discrimination, build health equity, and restore opportunity for people with criminal records, substance use disorders, and HIV or AIDS. 

In 1999, Flom received the "Torch of Liberty" award from the American Civil Liberties Union. He was named "Music Visionary of the Year" in 2000 by the UJA Federation. In 2004, The Correctional Association of New York honored him with their social justice award and in 2005 Flom received the T.J. Martell Foundation "Humanitarian Award." In 2008 Flom was honored as "Partner in Pursuit of Justice" by the Bronx Defenders and was awarded with City of Hope's "Ambassador Award." He received the Innocence Project's "Award for Freedom and Justice" in 2009 and the "Spirit of Life" award by Russell Simmons' Rush Philanthropic Arts Foundation in 2014. Flom was honored by The Innocence Project of New Orleans in 2017. At the 2022 Clio Awards, Flom was presented a Clio Music Impact Award for his work in criminal justice reform.

References

External links
Lava Records Official Website
Article, New York Magazine Nov 2016
Interview, 20/20 Feb 2018
Interview, Vice News March 2018

American music industry executives
Living people
Wrongful conviction advocacy
Year of birth missing (living people)
The Bronx Defenders